Malaconothridae is a family of mites belonging to the order Sarcoptiformes.

Genera:
 Elapheremaeus Grandjean, 1943
 Fossonothrus Hammer, 1962
 Malaconothrus Berlese, 1904
 Tyrphonothrus Knülle, 1957
 Zeanothrus Hammer, 1966

References

Sarcoptiformes